Dryhill is a small hamlet in the Sevenoaks district, in the county of Kent, England.

Location 
It is about two miles away from the large town of Sevenoaks, located near the A25 road between Sevenoaks and Sundridge.

Transport 
For transport there is the Sevenoaks railway station and the A25 road, the M25 motorway, M20 motorway and the M26 motorway nearby.

Local Nature Reserve 

The Dryhill Local Nature Reserve based on an old ragstone quarry at the edge of the village covers some 20 hectares. The quarry is also a Geological interest listed Site of Special Scientific Interest.

It is no longer managed by Kent County Council, but remains open as a Country Park and picnic area.

References 

 A-Z Great Britain Road Atlas (page 181)

Villages in Kent
Sevenoaks District
Dryhill Picnic Site
Local Nature Reserves in Kent
Allington Quarry